Aby Tom Cyriac is an Indian composer, arranger and programmer. He is a well known music arranger and programmer to major music composers in the Indian film industry.

Early life
Aby Tom Cyriac was born in Kanjirappally, Kottayam, Kerala to Mr.Cyriac Thomas and Mrs.Shaji Cyriac.

His musical abilities were spotted early in his life, and he started working with church choirs when he was studying in 5th standard. At such a young age, he had also started playing for several stage programs. He started exploring his music life when he met Fr. Sebastian Vechookarottu who is a Priest as well as a musician. It was Fr. Sebastian who opened him the wide world of music through different opportunities. The development of his career was through devotional songs and programs.

Career

Music programming and arranging
His interests, later on moved to Music arranging and programming. He got a chance to work for film music when he was in college, doing his B.Com. Since then he has been working in the industry programming and arranging music for many well known composers. Apart from Malayalam, he has got opportunities to work with some of the leading composers in Tamil, Telugu and Kannada film industry as well. By 2021 he has arranged and programmed music for more than 250 movies and 100 Jingles in different languages, including soundtrack and background scores.

Film scoring and soundtracks
Aby debuted as an independent music composer through the 2013 produced Malayalam movie Second Innings. The movie did not get released due to some technical problems. Later in 2015, he composed music for movie Pavada Starring Prithviraj Sukumaran. The songs were super hit and were in the top charts.

Personal life
Born to Mr. Cyriac Thomas and Mrs. Shaji Cyriac in Kanjirappally, Kottayam Dist. He has a younger sister named Annu Mary Cyriac. He with his parents have settled in Cochin, Kerala.

Discography

References

External links

 
 
 

1989 births
Living people
Malayalam film score composers
Musicians from Kochi
Indian record producers
Indian male film score composers